Karl Dedecius (20 May 1921 in Łódź – 26 February 2016) was a Polish-born German translator of Polish and Russian literature.

Life
Dedecius was born to German parents in the city of Łódź, Poland, then a multicultural city, which at that time had recently once again become a part of the Second Polish Republic. Dedecius attended the Polish Stefan-Żeromski High School, where he received his high-school degree (Matura). After the German invasion of Poland in the Second World War, Dedecius was first drafted into the Reich Labor Service (Reichsarbeitsdienst) and then into the German Army. He was severely wounded in the Battle of Stalingrad and became a prisoner of war. During his time as a prisoner of war in the Soviet Union, he taught himself Russian. Dedecius wrote, "I lay in my sick-bed, and the nurses brought me books by Lermontov, for instance. For one year, I learned the Cyrillic Alphabet and Russian by reading Lermontov and Pushkin. Eventually, the guards asked me to write love-letters for them, because I wrote like Pushkin."

Dedecius was released in 1950. He settled at first with his fiancé in Weimar, in East Germany. In 1952, he emigrated to West Germany and became an employee of the Allianz AG insurance company. In his free time, he occupied himself with Polish culture and with Polish literary translation, and maintained contact with Polish writers. Dedecius remarked ... "Only when I had gotten myself set up in life and enjoyed some stability was I able to turn to literature in a long-term and systematic way, although my career, you could say, had nothing whatever to do with writing." In the introduction to the Polish edition of "On Translating," Jerzy Kwiatkowski wrote: "Speaking formally, one could say that this translator’s great work came about on his evenings off, as a result of a hobby."

In 1959, he published his first anthology, Lektion der Stille (Lesson of Silence). In the following years, he translated, so to speak in his free time, such well-known Polish writers as Zbigniew Herbert, Stanisław Jerzy Lec, Czesław Miłosz, Tadeusz Różewicz and Wisława Szymborska. He also published essays on literature and translating technique.

In 1980, he initiated the German Poland Institute in Darmstadt. He served as the institute's director from 1980 through 1997. Meanwhile, continued his literary activities. Dedecius’ main achievements were the 50-volume "Polish Library" canon, which appeared between 1982 and 2000 from the Suhrkamp Verlag publishing house and the 7-volume "Panorama of Polish Literature of the 20th Century" (1996–2000), whose final volume presented a kind of Dedecius autobiography.

Dedecius died in Frankfurt, Germany on 26 February 2016 at the age of 94.

Honors
Dedecius received many honorary doctorates, prizes and awards. In 1967, he was awarded the Johann-Heinrich-Voß-Preis für Übersetzung. In 1990, he received the Friedenspreis des Deutschen Buchhandels, in 1997 the Samuel-Bogumil-Linde-Preis. Since 2004, the Robert Bosch Stiftung, in cooperation with the German Poland institute, awards the Karl-Dedecius-Preis for translators, which is endowed with a prize of €10,000.

References
This article is a translation of the equivalent German-language Wikipedia article (retrieved 17 August 2006). The following references are cited by that German-language article:

Works
1971: Deutsche und Polen. Botschaft der Bücher. [Germans and Poles: The Diplomacy of Books] München: Hanser. .
1974 "Überall ist Polen" [Poland is Everywhere], Frankfurt a.M.: Suhrkamp. 
1975: Polnische Profile [Polish Profiles]. Frankfurt a.M.: Suhrkamp. .
1981: Zur Literatur und Kultur Polens [On the Literature and Culture of Poland] Frankfurt a.M.: Suhrkamp. 
1981: Polnische Pointen Satiren und kleine Prosa des 20.Jahrhunderts Karl Dedecius. Ullstein Buch
1986: Vom Übersetzen. Theorie und Praxis [On Translating: Theory and Practice] Frankfurt a.M.: Suhrkamp. .
1988: Von Polens Poeten [On Poland’s Poets] Frankfurt a.M.: Suhrkamp. .
1990: Lebenslauf aus Büchern und Blättern [A Curriculum Vitae Made of Books and Pages] Frankfurt a.M.: Suhrkamp. .
1996: Ost West Basar. Ansprachen Essays Würdigungen. [East-West Bazaar: Addresses, Essays and Appreciations] With a Foreword by Marion Gräfin Dönhoff. Selected and with an Afterword by Andreas Lawaty. Zürich: Ammann-Verlag. 
2000: Panorama der polnischen Literatur des 20. Jahrhunderts. Abt.V. Panorama. Ein Rundblick [Panorama of Polish Literature of the 20th Century: Section V. Panorama.] Zürich: Ammann-Verlag. .
2002: Die Kunst der Übersetzung [The Art of Translating] Berlin: Logos Verlag. .
2006: Ein Europäer aus Lodz : Erinnerungen [A European from Lodz: Memoirs] Frankfurt am Main: Suhrkamp,

Literature
Elvira Grözinger, Andreas Lawaty (Eds.): Suche die Meinung: Karl Dedecius, dem Übersetzer und Mittler zum 65. Geburtstag [Searching for the Opinion: Festschrift for the Translator and Intermediary Karl Dedecius on his 65th Birthday] Wiesbaden 1986, Otto Harrassowitz. .
Manfred Mack (Ed.): "Karl Dedecius und das Deutsche Polen-Institut. Laudationes, Berichte, Interviews, Gedichte" [Karl Dedecius and the German Poland Institute. Laidatios, Reports, Interviews, Poems]. Darmstadt 1991, Justus von Liebig Verlag,  .
Hubert Orłowski: Karl Dedecius, in Marek Zybura (Ed.): ...nie będzie nigdy Niemiec Polakowi bratem...? Wrocław: Okis. pp. 268–279. .

References

External links

Marion Gräfin Dönhoff, „Beheimatet in Polen und Deutschland. Aus einer Laudatio auf Karl Dedecius...“, DIE ZEIT 11/1986
Marion Gräfin Dönhoff, „Mittler zwischen schwierigen Nachbarn“, DIE ZEIT 04/2002
Karl-Dedecius-Archiv im Collegium Polonicum
Deutsches Polen-Institut, Darmstadt
Friedenspreis des Deutschen Buchhandels

1921 births
2016 deaths
German prisoners of war in World War II held by the Soviet Union
Writers from Łódź
People from Łódź Voivodeship (1919–1939)
Translators from Polish
Translators from Russian
Translators to German
German translation scholars
Knights Commander of the Order of Merit of the Federal Republic of Germany
Commanders of the Order of Merit of the Republic of Poland
20th-century German translators
Naturalized citizens of Germany
20th-century German male writers
German male non-fiction writers
Writers from Darmstadt
Recipients of the Order of the White Eagle (Poland)
Reich Labour Service members
German Army personnel of World War II
Polish emigrants to Germany